The 2018 Sibiu Open was a professional tennis tournament played on clay courts. It was the seventh edition of the tournament which was part of the 2018 ATP Challenger Tour. It took place in Sibiu, Romania between 17 and 23 September 2018.

Singles main-draw entrants

Seeds

 1 Rankings are as of 10 September 2018.

Other entrants
The following players received wildcards into the singles main draw:
  Victor Vlad Cornea
  Michał Dembek
  Dragoș Dima
  Adrian Ungur

The following player received entry into the singles main draw as an alternate:
  Aldin Šetkić

The following players received entry from the qualifying draw:
  Nicolae Frunză
  Jeremy Jahn
  Fabrizio Ornago
  Jelle Sels

The following player received entry as a lucky loser:
  Javier Barranco Cosano

Champions

Singles

 Dragoș Dima def.  Jelle Sels 6–3, 6–2.

Doubles

  Kevin Krawietz /  Andreas Mies def.  Tomasz Bednarek /  David Pel 6–4, 6–2.

External links
Official Website

2018 ATP Challenger Tour
2018
2018 in Romanian tennis